Robert Samuel Langer (born 3 October 1948) is a former cricketer who played for Western Australia in the 1970s and 1980s. He was a left-handed middle order batsman and occasional right-arm medium pace bowler. Langer's first-class career extended from 1973–1974 until 1981–1982. He made 2,756 first-class runs in 44 matches at an average of 43.06 with a highest score of 150 not out. In 15 limited overs matches, his best score was 99 not out in a total of 338 runs at 28.16 average. Langer scored five first-class hundreds and 18 half-centuries during his career. In 1977, he signed to play World Series Cricket for the WSC Australian team and spent the 1977–78 and 1978–79 seasons with WSC.

Career
Langer made his first class debut in 1973-74 for West Australia against New Zealand, scoring 42 and 20.

He began the 1974–75 season well with 41 not out and 66 against South Australia and 62 against the touring English side. Towards the end of the 1974–75 season, he scored his maiden first class century, 150 against Victoria, then made 72 against NSW. Some journalists said he was a possibility of the 1975 Ashes but he was not picked.

In 1975-76 Langer scored 111 and 64 against NSW but was outshone by Kim Hughes' century in the latter's first class debut. He made 91 and 76 against the touring West Indians. There was instability in the Australian team that summer; Langer was discussed as a test prospect but the selectors eventually went with Graham Yallop and Gary Cosier.

Langer performed well during the 1976–77 season, including 55 and 76 against New South Wales, 77 against Victoria, 87 against Pakistan, 52 against Victoria, 71 vs NSW and 83 against the touring English. In January 1977 Ian Chappell picked Langer for his hypothetical squad to tour England in 1977, stating that:
Langer impresses me because he has proven himself as a consistent batsmen over the past few years. I've always believed that it takes 3–4 years to prove yourself as a Shield batsman, and Langer has achieved that. He is more of a grafting batsman than any of his rivals and that should definitely count in his favour, given the current state of Australian batting. He probably doesn't have as much natural ability as some others around, but he has proved that he can make best use of what he has got. He's prepared to work hard, and has tightened his game a lot since he came into first class cricket. His ability to get his head down and his tight defence will both be strong assets in England.
However Australian selectors preferred Hughes, Craig Serjeant and David Hookes.

World Series Cricket
In October 1977 Langer signed to play with World Series Cricket for three years at a total of $75,000. Langer considered the offer for almost three weeks.

Langer played two supertests during the 1977–78 season, making 45 and 8 against the West Indies and 39 and 12 against the World XI.

Return to First Class Cricket
In 1979-80 Langer scored 137 against the touring West Indians and 102 against Queensland. However he was not able to force his way into the Australian side.

He was dropped from West Australia in 1980-81 but forced his way back in to the side. He made 84 against the touring Indians.

In the 1981–82 season he scored 140 against Queensland, and 75 against Tasmania. He also scored 99 not out in a one-day game against Tasmania, winning the man of the match award. Langer retired from first class cricket at the end of the season.

Retirement
After retiring from cricket, Langer went on to be Chief Executive Officer of the Western Australian Speedway Commission from 1999 until 2001, whereupon he became a Senior Consultant. In June 2002, Langer was appointed as High Performance Manager for the Western Australian Cricket Association.

Langer is the uncle of Justin Langer, former Australian Test batsman and Somerset County Cricket Club captain.

Notes

External links
 

1948 births
Australian cricketers
Western Australia cricketers
Living people
World Series Cricket players
Australian chief executives
Cricketers from Perth, Western Australia